Åmål is a locality and the seat of Åmål Municipality in Västra Götaland County, Sweden with 9,065 inhabitants in 2010. It is situated on the western shore of Vänern.

In 2005 Åmål received second prize in the international competition The International Awards for Liveable Communities (also known as the LivCom Awards). A blues festival has been held annually in Åmål since 1992.

History 

Åmål was founded in the 17th century by Queen Christina, and became one of the now defunct Cities of Sweden on April 1, 1643, and the only city in the historical province of Dalsland. Its location close to the borders of the Denmark-Norway alliance made it vulnerable to attack and it accordingly suffered over the ensuing centuries: first in 1645, when it was almost completely demolished, again in 1676 and 1679; and the last time in 1788 when it was conquered by the Danes, who then held it for a short while.

The town suffered devastating fires in 1777, 1809, 1846 and 1901. After the last severe fire in 1901, whereby 1000 people became homeless, and one third of the city was burnt to the ground, it was rebuilt with wider streets and larger houses in a Jugend style of architecture. The area of wooden houses, the so-called Plantaget, south of the river, the Åmålsån, that runs through the town into the lake, was spared by the fire and today forms the "old town" area.

Show Me Love (Fucking Åmål)
The 1998 movie Fucking Åmål (known in the English-speaking world as Show Me Love), directed by Lukas Moodysson, is set in Åmål. The movie depicts the town as extremely boring and it was largely filmed in the nearby town of Trollhättan. The film created controversy in the town of Åmål. Local politicians campaigned to get the title of the film changed. The local complaints had no effect on the content or release of the film and since the release of the film the town of Åmål has even tried to embrace the publicity generated. In the early 2000s the town founded the pop music festival "Fucking Åmål Festival".

Sports
The following sports clubs are located in Åmål:

 IF Viken 
 IFK Åmål

Notable people
 Anders Fryxell (1795 in Edsleskog – 1881) historian and writer.
 Amy Segerstedt (1835  in Åmål – 1928) teacher, folk teacher, and philanthropist
 Rut Berglund, (1897 in Åmål – 1984) an operatic mezzo-soprano and contralto
 Karl Gustav Jöreskog (born 1935 in Åmål) statistician.
 Egzon Binaku (born 1995 in Åmål) a footballer who plays for IFK Norrköping.

See also 
Åmål Municipality

References 

Municipal seats of Västra Götaland County
Swedish municipal seats
Populated places in Västra Götaland County
Populated places in Åmål Municipality
Populated lakeshore places in Sweden
Dalsland
1643 establishments in Sweden